Khuda Aur Mohabbat is the third season of Pakistani spiritual-romance series Khuda Aur Mohabbat. Produced by Abdullah Kadwani and Asad Qureshi under 7th Sky Entertainment, it features Feroze Khan and Iqra Aziz in lead roles. The season premiered on 12 February 2021. The series received high viewership ratings but mixed to negative reviews from critics, with particular praise for Feroze and Iqra's performance but criticized the story for being problematic. Feroze Khan played an important role in this drama.The series is the most watched Pakistani television series on YouTube with over 2 billion + views.

Plot 

The season starts with Mahi and her sister-in-law arriving in Lahore. A man she meets, Taimoor, can't stop thinking about Mahi. A young man named Farhad is doing illegal things, so his parents send him somewhere to work.

Farhad and Mahi meet at a wedding and their friendship blossoms. Mahi uses this time as a release from her strict life at home and enjoys Farhad's friendship, but Farhad falls in love with her. Farhad starts working as a guard for Mahi's brother, Nazim Shah, and finds out Mahi hails from a very rich and influential family where it is difficult to see or speak to her. Farhad becomes friends with a man named Dilawar. Another female servant, Sajal, falls in love with Farhad but he tells her that his love lies elsewhere, upsetting her.

After meeting Taimoor, Mahi's family agree to have her marry him. Mahi at first doesn't want to marry him, but later prepares to, which upsets Farhad. When Mahi clarifies her real feelings to Farhad in a private library, he curses her saying she will never find peace and she will always suffer. After Farhad leaves, Mahi is worried after being cursed by Farhad.

Soon after, the news reaches Mahi, Sajal, Mahi's sister-in-law, the family in Lahore, Dilawar, Nazim Shah and Kazim Shah (Mahi's father), Farhad's family and his neighbour Naheed (who has been living with his family since he left his home to follow Mahi back to her home town) that Farhad has died after falling under a train. Despite this, Mahi's wedding proceeds, but when Mahi and Taimoor are on their way to their new home, Taimoor is fatally shot.

Suriyya, Farhad's mother, is now in a critical condition after hearing the news of Farhad's death, and becomes depressed and obsesses about Farhad. The Derwesh is seen recalling his prophecy of how there will be shenai (wedding celebrations) as well as maatam (mourning). 

Taimoor's mother, Jagirdaarni, is aware that he has been killed by an enemy of Nazim Shah and publicly holds him accountable. She refuses to allow Mahi to return to Bahawalpur, her maternal home, despite Mahi's mother requesting this. She demands that Mahi stay with her family for the sake of tradition.

Farhad is revealed to be alive and meets Romana and Chanda Ji on a train. Farhad continues his journey on a train to Multan, City of the Saints. Romana is the courtesan entangled with Sikandar, Taimoor's older brother.

The train stops, and Farhad goes to a shrine where he encounters the Derwesh, who welcomes him. Mahi's parents worry about how she is coping in unfamiliar surroundings with a new family in Multan especially because of Jagirdaarni's obvious resentment towards the family following Taimoor's death. However, over time Mahi develops a bond with Jagidaarni who is taken by Mahi's affection towards her two grandchildren.

Romana, after her encounter on the train with Farhad, constantly thinks about him. She often mentions him to Chanda Ji [the Head Courtesan of the brothel], that both Romana and Farhad are love sick for those whom it's difficult to meet with.

It has now been forty days since the death of Taimoor. Jagirdaarni reluctantly invites Mahi's family from Bahawalpur for the special prayers. She remains hostile towards Mahi. Jagirdaarni has requested the Derwesh to attend the prayer gathering and make dua. He agrees and takes Farhad with him not knowing he is so close to his beloved. The Darwesh reaches the doorstep of the haveli and offers prayers there, returning from that very spot.

While shopping for things for the mazaar, Farhad meets Romana. She brings him to his house then Sikandar arrives and meets Farhad. Jagirdaarni asks Mahi to forgive her for her harshness. Farhad and Mahi have dreams of their encounters. Meanwhile, Naheed is getting married and Suriyya believes that Farhad is the man that Naheed is marrying. After realizing that Farhad is still gone, she becomes depressed again.

Back in Multan, after asking Sikandar's main servant where he was the night before, Jagirdaarni finds out that Sikandar went to Rumana's house and couldn't come home because there was heavy rain the night before and all the streets were closed, and the servant requests that the family should prepare for Sikandar's new wedding. The Derwesh then asks Farhad to return to the same haveli they went to for dua.

Then two servants ask Jagirdaarni to have Mahi marry Sikandar, to which she agrees because it is the end of her iddat and she doesn't want Mahi to go. Later, Mahi secretly sends the same two servants to send an invitation to the haveli to the woman Sikandar keeps meeting, not knowing she is the same girl she met when it was 40 days since Taimoor's death. When the girl, revealed to be Romana, gets the invitation, she is elated and decides to go there. When Romana goes to the haveli and Mahi sees who she is, they talk and Romana decides to never meet Sikandar again. Later, Jagirdaarni asks Sikandar to marry Mahi, but Sikandar rejects this.

Romana is now heartbroken over Sikandar. Mahi and Farhad meet for the first time since Mahi and Farhad's talk in the library before Farhad's supposed death. Meanwhile, Sikandar learns that Romana has left and does not intend to return, so he decides to learn what happened to her.

Farhad and Mahi continue to have visual contact and the Derwesh tells Farhad they will always meet each other. Farhad learns that Jagirdaarni repeatedly goes to the mazaar because Mahi's husband, Taimoor, was murdered on their wedding night when they were travelling back home by Kazim Shah's enemies, so they return here to pray. Farhad then remembers that he had cursed Mahi.

At the mazaar, Mahi sees Farhad and asks him why he made himself a mess and why he can't just return home. Farhad replies that he will only return to his home with Mahi. Then, Mahi gives Farhad the taweez (necklace) that he gave to her, saying that she will only wear it when he returns home. Farhad tells Sikandar that he has not seen Romana since he was at her house. Farhad then realizes that he can see Mahi within the taweez.

Then, Kazim Shah, Nazim Shah and Mahi's mother, Bari Sarkar agree to have Mahi marry Sikandar. But Mahi still loves Farhad, despite not wanting to. Mahi agrees to marry Sikandar and their marriage preparations begin. Farhad is invited to the haveli for Sikandar and Mahi's Rukhsati. Jagirdaarni offers Mahi to take over the house. When Farhad arrives at the haveli, he is recognised and his family is informed that he is still alive. Farhad's family then visit the mazaar to make dua for Farhad. Farhad and his family then recognise each other. Farhad tells them that he will return home after the Derwesh, who is away, returns to the mazaar.

Mahi tells Farhad that they are not meant for each other in this life, but in the afterlife, she would ask Allah to stay with Farhad forever. Nazim Shah learns of this and exposes Mahi and Farhad's relationship to her parents. He and Nooray then go to the mazaar and warn Farhad to stay away. Sikandar goes to the mazaar and learns of Farhad and Mahi's history together. Nazim Shah and Nooray tell Dilawar, Farhad's old friend whom they have hired, to kill a Derwesh at the mazaar, not telling Dilawar that the "Derwesh" is really Farhad wearing the Derwesh's cloak. Jagirdaarni and Sikandar go to Kazim Shah's house and propose that Mahi marry Farhad, but he refuses. But Jagirdaarni decides that Mahi will marry Farhad, nonetheless. Meanwhile, Sikandar finds Romana and promises that she will stay with him forever.

Dilawar stabs Farhad, not knowing it is him, so when he sees Farhad's face, he is horrified. Sikandar goes to the mazaar to save Farhad, while Jagirdaarni goes to Mahi's house and calls out Nazim Shah for planning it. Farhad gains consciousness and lies to the police officer in his statement saying that his stabbing was just a coincidence, therefore protecting his friend Dilawar. Farhad then tries to leave the hospital and go to the mazaar, hoping for Mahi to arrive and meet him. Dilawar ultimately takes himself and Farhad to the mazaar, while Jagirdaarni tries to convince Bari Sarkar to change her mind on Farhad.

Bari Sarkar convinces Kazim Shah to ultimately accept Mahi and Farhad's relationship but Nazim Shah is not going to let that happen and soon he holds Mahi at gunpoint. Kazim Shah arrives with a rifle and tells Nazim Shah that he will forget Nazim Shah is his son. Nazim Shah ultimately leaves. Kazim Shah lets Mahi, Bari Sarkar and Jagirdaarni go to the mazaar and admits that after this he will forget that Mahi is his daughter. Meanwhile, Farhad is lying down at the front gate of the mazaar with Dilawar by his side, desperately waiting for Mahi to come. Sikandar and Romana arrive to bring Mahi to the mazaar and when they get there, Farhad sees them and gets up.

Farhad and Mahi stare at each other for a while then Farhad falls down. They then talk and Farhad dies. Mahi, in shock, remembers her words about staying with Farhad forever in the afterlife, then Mahi falls to the ground and dies, too. Then Farhad and Mahi's dead bodies are shown together on the ground side-by-side. The ending was tragic yet spiritual at the same time. The season ends with a thank-you to the viewers for the success of the show.

Cast and characters

Main
Feroze Khan as Farhad/Feedi 
Iqra Aziz as Mahi Kazim Shah & Mrs Taimoor Shah

Recurring
Junaid Khan as Sikandar
Tooba Siddiqui as Romana
Mirza Zain Baig as Taimoor Shah
Noor ul Hassan as Darvesh
Hina Khawaja Bayat as Jagirdaarni
Rubina Ashraf as Bari Sarkar
Usmaan Peerzada as Kazim Shah
Sunita Marshall as Sahiba
Asma Abbas as Suriyya Bibi
Waseem Abbas as Taufeeq
Sohail Sameer as Nazim Shah
Mehar Bano as Rida
Momina Iqbal as Naheed
Fawad Jalal as Sajjad
Seemi Pasha as Arfa Begum
Shameen Khan as Sajal
Hira Somroo as Fariya
Saqib Sameer as Dilawar
Saad Rasheed
Malik Raza as Noora
Fareeha Jabeen as Fakira
Munazzah Arif as Chanda
Alyy Khan
Zeshan Khan

Soundtrack

The original soundtrack of Khuda Aur Mohabbat's third season was released on January 29, 2021, at 20:00 (PST). The soundtrack is composed by Naveed Nashad and the lyrics are penned down by Qamar Nashad. It is sung by Rahat Fateh Ali Khan and Nish Asher. The Ost has more than 257 million+ views on YouTube.

Production

Development and casting
After the finale of season 2, Babar Javed announced the next season with Imran returning. Later on, it was revealed that Babar was replaced by Abdullah Kadwani as head of the network. Abdullah revamped the whole project by casting Feroze Khan, Iqra Aziz as lead actors for the season with Syed Wajahat Hussain directing the season, produce under Abdullah's own production house, 7th Sky Entertainment.

The first teaser was released on January 1, 2021 at 20:00 (PST). The broadcast of the season hit the screens on February 12, 2021, on Geo Entertainment and follows every Friday at 20:00 (PST).
With just five episodes it crossed 100+ million views on YouTube. It is the first Pakistani serial to have more than 2+ billion views on its episodes collectively on YouTube. The season was slated to go off air on 29 October but it was delayed for a week and aired its final episode on 5 November due to Pakistan's cricket match in the 2021 ICC Men's T20 World Cup.

Filming

The principal photography began in late 2019 which lasted for almost one and half years.
The shooting takes place at a number of locations. It began at Lahore which was shown as Fadi's house. The locations change with every changing sequences of the serial. The sequence of railways station and Haveli were shot at Bahawalpur railway station and Gulzar Mahal respectively. Shooting is extensively done in Karachi also. Notable location from the sequences of Multan includes Tomb of Shah Rukn-e-Alam.Darbar of Shah Shams.

Awards and nominations

References

External links 

Khuda Aur Muhabbat
2021 Pakistani television seasons
2021 Pakistani television series debuts
Television series set in Bahawalpur